Ghazi Ilm Deen Shaheed also written as Ilm Din (4 December 1908 – 31 October 1929) was an Indian Muslim carpenter who assassinated a book publisher named Mahashe Rajpal for publishing the book Rangila Rasul, which was considered derogatory towards the Islamic prophet, Muhammad, by Muslims. He was executed for this crime.

Background 
Mahashe Rajpal published an anonymous pamphlet in 1923 titled Rangila Rasul, which contained a reexamination of the hadiths of Sahih al-Bukhari, among other sources, along with an allegedly salacious commentary. Rangila Rasul had a surface appearance of a lyrical and laudatory work on Muhammad and his teachings and called Muhammad "a widely experienced" person who was best symbolized by his many wives.

Various sections of the Indian Muslim community started a movement demanding that the book be banned. In 1927, the administration of the British Raj enacted a law prohibiting insults aimed at founders and leaders of religious communities.

Murder
Ilm Deen decided to kill the publisher. On April 6, 1929, he set out for the bazaar and purchased a dagger for one rupee. He hid the dagger in his pants and waited for Rajpal at some distance from Rajpal's shop. Rajpal had not arrived yet. Ilm Deen did not know what Rajpal looked like. He tried to find out where Rajpal was through people that were around. Rajpal entered the shop and Ilm Deen did not notice him but soon someone alerted him that Rajpal was inside. The young man entered the shop, lunged forward and attacked him. He stabbed his dagger into the chest of Rajpal. He fell to the ground and died instantly. The police arrested Ilm Deen and took him to Lahori Gate Police Station. Later Ilm Deen was shifted to Central Jail Mianwali. The murder caused considerable religious tension in Punjab and beyond.

Trial and execution
The trial lawyer for Ilm Deen was Farrukh Hussain. 

Two witnesses from the prosecution side claimed that he was guilty. Muhammad Ali Jinnah, then a prominent Indian lawyer, and later the founder of Pakistan, was then sought out to appear in the appeal hearing at the Lahore High Court. Jinnah appealed on the grounds of extenuating circumstances, saying that Ilm Deen was only 19 or 20. He asked for the death sentence to be commuted to imprisonment for life. This contention was rejected by the court. Ilm Deen was convicted and given the death penalty according to the Indian Penal Code, and subsequently executed.

References

1908 births
1929 deaths
Punjabi people
Indian people convicted of murder
Indian assassins
Carpenters
20th-century executions by British India
People executed by British India by hanging
Burials at Miani Sahib Graveyard
Indian Islamists